This is a gallery of flags of South American countries and affiliated international organizations.

International

Flags of South American sovereign states

Flags of South American dependencies and other territories

Flags of South American cities

Flags of cities with over 1 million inhabitants.

Historical flags

See also
Flags of North America
Flag of Gran Colombia
Flags depicting the Southern Cross
List of countries
Sun of May
Wiphala

 Lists of flags of South American countries

 List of Argentine flags
 List of Brazilian flags
 List of Chilean flags
 List of Colombian flags
 List of Ecuadorian flags
 List of flags of Peru
 List of Uruguayan flags
 List of flags of Venezuela

 
South America
South America